Elaea or Elaia, also Elea (Ἐλέα), was a town of Thesprotia in ancient Epirus toward the mouth of the Acheron river. The town is mentioned by Ptolemy. Thucydides calls the surrounding district Elaeatis (Ἐλαιατις) and indicates that Ephyra was in the territory of Elaea. Its port was Elaias Limen, literally the "Bay of Elaea", which the Periplus of Pseudo-Scylax asserts was the main port of Thesprotia.

Coins ascribed to the town, with the inscription "ΕΛΕΑΤΑΝ" or "ΕΛΕΑΙ", have been found that have been dated . 

The town's site is identified as near Chrysavgi, where archaeological exploration has taken place.

Gallery

References

 Smith, William (editor); Dictionary of Greek and Roman Geography, "Acheron", London, (1854)
 Richard Talbert, Barrington Atlas of the Greek and Roman World,, p. 54

See also
List of cities in ancient Epirus

Populated places in ancient Epirus
Former populated places in Greece
Archaeological sites in Epirus (region)
Tourist attractions in Greece
Buildings and structures in Thesprotia